The Campeonato Brasileiro de Futebol Feminino Série A2 (Brazilian Women's National Championship Second Level) is an annual Brazilian women's club football tournament organized by the CBF.

The semi-finalists are promoted to Campeonato Brasileiro de Futebol Feminino Série A1. The distribution of participating teams will be by the CBF Women's Football Ranking and from 2018 onwards, it will be by state representatives who will dispute a preliminary phase to define the participants.

Distribution

In 2017
 The top 16 in the CBF Women's Football Ranking who are not already in the Campeonato Brasileiro de Futebol Feminino Série A1.

 16 Associations.

In 2018

 The 2 relegateds of the Campeonato Brasileiro de Futebol Feminino Série A1 last year;
 The first state of the RNF (National Ranking of Federations) has the right to a representative;
 The other states have one representative each in the preliminary phase.

 29 Associations.

In 2019

 The 2 relegateds of the Campeonato Brasileiro de Futebol Feminino Série A1 last year;
 One representative from each of the 27 states;
 The top 7 in the CBF Ranking (Male) that are not already in the Campeonato Brasileiro de Futebol Feminino Série A1.

 36 Associations.

In 2020

 The 4 relegateds of the Campeonato Brasileiro de Futebol Feminino Série A1 last year;
 One representative from each of the 27 states;
 The top 5 in the CBF Ranking (Male) that are not already in the Campeonato Brasileiro de Futebol Feminino Série A1

 36 Associations.

In 2021

 The 4 relegateds of the Campeonato Brasileiro de Futebol Feminino Série A1 last year;
 One representative from each of the 27 states;
 The top 5 in the CBF Ranking (Male) that are not already in the Campeonato Brasileiro de Futebol Feminino Série A1

 36 Associations.

In 2022

 The 4 teams relegated from the previous year's Campeonato Brasileiro de Futebol Feminino Série A1;
 The remaining 12 of the Campeonato Brasileiro de Futebol Feminino Série A2

 16 Associations.

List of Champions

Below is a list of all Campeonato Brasileiro Série A2 champions:

See also
Sport in Brazil
Football in Brazil
Women's football in Brazil
Campeonato Brasileiro Série A1
Campeonato Brasileiro Série A3
Copa do Brasil de Futebol Feminino
Copa Libertadores Femenina

Notes

References

External links
Official website 
soccerway.com, fixtures and results

Brasileiro de Futebol Feminino